Thomas R. Kersh (died 1916) was a state legislator in Arkansas. A Republican, he represented Lincoln County, Arkansas in the Arkansas House of Representatives in 1885 and 1887.
According to the captioning from his 1885 House photograph he was 38 years old, was a native of South Carolina, had lived in Arkansas for 18 years, was a Republican, worked a Baptist Minister, and his post office was in Varner's Station.

See also
African-American officeholders during and following the Reconstruction era

References

Year of birth missing
1916 deaths
Republican Party members of the Arkansas House of Representatives
19th-century African-American politicians
19th-century American politicians
People from South Carolina
1840s births
People from Lincoln County, Arkansas
19th-century Baptist ministers from the United States